Laura Rericha-Anchor is an American biologist with expertise in botany, ornithology, entomology, and ecology of the Midwestern United States.

Career
Largely self-taught since a young age, Rericha began as a naturalist with the Forest Preserves of Cook County, Illinois in 1997 and was mentored by Floyd Swink. , she worked as a wildlife biologist for the Forest Preserves of Cook County and as a research associate with Conservation Research Institute. Rericha was recognized by the Board of Commissioners of Cook County in May 2017 for her significant contribution to science through the publishing of Flora of the Chicago Region, "enabling both the professional and amateur botanist to better understand our region’s plants and insects". In addition to detailing the over 3,100 vascular plant species found in the region, the book documents hundreds of new ecological relationships between specific plants and their associated insects and other fauna.

Publications

References

Botanists active in North America
20th-century American botanists
21st-century American botanists
Living people
1971 births